Semiomphalina is a basidiolichen genus in the family Hygrophoraceae. The genus is monotypic, containing the single species Semiomphalina leptoglossoides, found in Papua New Guinea.

See also
 List of Agaricales genera

References

External links
 

Hygrophoraceae
Lichen genera
Monotypic Agaricales genera
Basidiolichens
Taxa described in 1984